Jonah Hill is an American actor and producer.

He is best known for his comedic roles in I Heart Huckabees (2004), The Forty Year Old Virgin (2005), Accepted (2006), Knocked Up (2007), Superbad (2007), Forgetting Sarah Marshall (2008), Get Him to the Greek (2010), 21 Jump Street (2012), its 2014 sequel as well as This is the End (2013). 

Hill is also known for his critically acclaimed performances in the independent dramedy Cyrus (2010), Bennett Miller's Moneyball (2011), Quentin Tarantino's western Django Unchained (2012), Martin Scorsese's crime film The Wolf of Wall Street (2013), the Coen Brothers comedy Hail, Caesar! (2016), and Gus Van Sant's Don't Worry, He Won't Get Far on Foot (2018). In 2018 he made his directorial film debut Mid90s. 

Hill received two Academy Award nominations for Best Supporting Actor for his work in Moneyball (2011), and Wolf of Wall Street (2013).

Film

Television

Video games

Music videos

References

Male actor filmographies
American filmographies